TLC is a Norwegian television channel. Its primary target is women between
25 and 49. The channel launched on March 4, 2010 and replaced Discovery Travel & Living Europe.

References

Norway
Television channels and stations established in 2010
Television channels in Norway
2010 establishments in Norway